In electronics, the Carey Foster bridge is a bridge circuit used to measure medium resistances, or to measure small differences between two large resistances. It was invented by Carey Foster as a variant on the Wheatstone bridge. He first described it in his 1872 paper "On a Modified Form of Wheatstone's Bridge, and Methods of Measuring Small Resistances" (Telegraph Engineer's Journal, 1872–1873, 1, 196).

Use

In the adjacent diagram, X and Y are resistances to be compared. P and Q are nearly equal resistances, forming the other half of the bridge. The bridge wire EF has a jockey contact D placed along it and is slid until the galvanometer G measures zero. The thick-bordered areas are thick copper busbars of very low resistance, to limit the influence on the measurement.

 Place a known resistance in position Y.
 Place the unknown resistance in position X.
 Adjust the contact D along the bridge wire EF so as to null the galvanometer.
 Swap X and Y. Adjust D to the new null point.

 

To measure a low unknown resistance X, replace Y with a copper busbar that can be assumed to be of zero resistance.

In practical use, when the bridge is unbalanced, the galvanometer is shunted with a low resistance to avoid burning it out. It is only used at full sensitivity when the anticipated 
measurement is close to the null point.

To measure σ 

To measure the unit resistance of the bridge wire EF, put a known resistance (e.g., a standard 1 ohm resistance) that is less than that of the wire as X, and a copper busbar of assumed zero resistance as Y.

Theory 

Two resistances to be compared, X and Y, are connected in series with the bridge wire. Thus, considered as a Wheatstone bridge, the two resistances are X plus a length of bridge wire, and Y plus the remaining bridge wire. The two remaining arms are the nearly equal resistances P and Q, connected in the inner gaps of the bridge.

and add 1 to each side:

       (equation 1)

Now swap X and Y.  is the new null point reading in percent:

and add 1 to each side:

       (equation 2)

Equations 1 and 2 have the same left-hand side and the same numerator on the right-hand side, meaning the denominator on the right-hand side must also be equal:

The bridge is most sensitive when P, Q, X and Y are all of comparable magnitude.

References 

Analog circuits
Bridge circuits
English inventions
Impedance measurements